The 1965–66 season was the 20th season in FK Partizan's existence. This article shows player statistics and matches that the club played during the 1965–66 season.

Players

Squad information

 (Captain)

Friendlies

Competitions

Yugoslav First League

Yugoslav Cup

European Cup

Preliminary round

First round

Quarter-finals

Semi-finals

Final

|valign="top"|

Statistics

Goalscorers 
This includes all competitive matches.

Score overview

See also
 List of FK Partizan seasons

References

External links
 Official website
 Partizanopedia 1965-66  (in Serbian)

FK Partizan seasons
Partizan